Gongyi, formerly Gong County, is a county-level city of Henan Province, South Central China, it is under the administration of the prefecture-level city of Zhengzhou.

City
Gongyi is located in the middle of Henan province, on the northern side of Mount Song. The Yellow River runs through the northern part of the city.

The city was once known as Zhenxun, and was reputedly capital of China during part of the Xia dynasty. According to the Bamboo Annals, Houyi occupied Zhenxun with his forces while the Xia king Taikang was off hunting beyond the Luo River. He was then usurped by his lieutenant Han Zhuo and his son before the Xia were eventually restored.

The celebrated Song tombs are scattered through the towns (zhen) of Xicun, Zhitian, and Huiguo. They are the resting place for 7 emperors of the Northern Song dynasty and the father of the dynasty's founder. There are also the graves of loyal ministers of the Song.

After the founding of the People’s Republic of China, Gongyi was placed under the jurisdiction of Zhengzhou but came under the control of Kaifeng in January 1955 before reverting to Zhengzhou in August 1983. In 1991, Gongyi became a county-level city, still under the jurisdiction of Zhengzhou.

Gongyi is thought to be the birthplace of the Tang dynasty poet Du Fu, often considered China's greatest poet.

Administrative divisions
As 2012, this city is divided to 5 subdistricts and 15 towns.
Subdistricts

Towns

Climate

References

External links
chinaexpat.com

 
Zhengzhou
Cities in Henan
County-level divisions of Henan